The Division of Flynn is an Australian Electoral Division in Queensland.

The current MP is Colin Boyce, a member of the Liberal National Party of Queensland. He was first elected in 2022.

Geography
Federal electoral division boundaries in Australia are determined at redistributions by a redistribution committee appointed by the Australian Electoral Commission. Redistributions occur for the boundaries of divisions in a particular state, and they occur every seven years, or sooner if a state's representation entitlement changes or when divisions of a state are malapportioned.

History

The division was created in 2006, following a redistribution of seats in the state. It was first contested at the 2007 federal election. The electorate generally extends west from the port city of Gladstone, as far as the Central Highlands town of Emerald. It was named after John Flynn, founder of the Royal Flying Doctor Service.

Formation
In June 2006, the Australian Electoral Commission announced that the new federal electorate in Queensland to be created for the 2007 election would be named Wright in honour of Judith Wright for her life as a "poet and in the areas of arts, conservation and indigenous affairs in Queensland and Australia". However, in September 2006 the AEC announced that, due to numerous objections from people fearing the name may be linked to disgraced former Queensland ALP leader Keith Wright, it would name the seat after John Flynn.

The city of Gladstone, home to 40% of Flynn's voters, has long been a Labor stronghold.  However, the rural areas vote in equally large numbers for the Liberal National Party.

Demographics 
Flynn is a largely blue-collar electorate. It tends to support the Liberal National Party. Its industries include a mix of mining and agriculture, as well as heavy industry around Gladstone. 

Labor maintains a base of support in Gladstone and Mount Morgan, and in the Aboriginal community of Woorabinda where it recorded 71.2% in 2019. Elsewhere in the electorate, voters skew conservative and vote heavily for the Liberal National Party. 

Similar voting trends can be seen in the nearby electorates of Capricornia, Dawson, and Herbert.

Members

Election results

References

External links
 Division of Flynn (Qld) — Australian Electoral Commission

Electoral divisions of Australia
Constituencies established in 2006
2006 establishments in Australia
Federal politics in Queensland